Borys Rassykhin (Boris Andreyevich Rassikhin; 27 April 1937 – 16 March 2021) was a Ukrainian professional football manager, who previously played as midfielder.

All his games for Shakhtar Rassykhin were played at the Soviet Top League. In 1963 he joined the newly created FC Karpaty Lviv that was admitted to the Class B.

After retiring from a playing career, in 1989 he became the first head coach of the revived Karpaty.

References

External links
 

1937 births
2021 deaths
Footballers from Moscow
Ukrainian footballers
Soviet footballers
Association football midfielders
FC Shakhtar Donetsk players
FC Karpaty Lviv players
FC Naftovyk Drohobych players
Soviet Top League players
Soviet football managers
Ukrainian football managers
FC Shakhtar Chervonohrad managers
FC Bukovyna Chernivtsi managers
FC Spartak Ivano-Frankivsk managers
FC Karpaty Lviv managers
FC Halychyna Drohobych managers
FC Hazovyk Komarno managers
FC Venita Lipkani managers
Ukrainian expatriate football managers
Expatriate football managers in Moldova